Goules is a village located on the southeast bank of the river Aliakmon in Servia municipality, Kozani regional unit, in the Greek region of Macedonia. It is situated at an altitude of 290 meters above sea level. The postal code is 50500, while the telephone code is +30 24640. At the 2011 census the population was 185.

References

Populated places in Kozani (regional unit)